Matthew Richard Allen Rodda (born 15 December 1966) is a British former journalist and civil servant, and a current Labour Party politician. He is the incumbent Member of Parliament (MP) for the Reading East parliamentary constituency and Shadow Minister for Pensions.

Early life and career
Rodda was raised in Wallingford in South Oxfordshire. He attended the University of Sussex in the 1980s and trained as a journalist with Thomson.

After graduating, he worked for the Coventry Telegraph and was also a journalist for The Independent newspaper, specialising in education news.

He later became a civil servant in the Department for Education, and subsequently worked in the charity sector and for the Higher Education Academy.

In October 1999, he survived the Ladbroke Grove rail crash, an event to which he has attributed his desire to make a contribution to the community.

Politics

Local government and early parliamentary bids
Rodda was elected as a councillor for the Katesgrove Ward of Reading Borough Council in 2011. He stood without success for election in the East Surrey parliamentary constituency at the 2010 general election, and for the Reading East parliamentary constituency at the 2015 general election.

MP in the 2017 parliament
Rodda was elected for the Reading East constituency on 8 June 2017 at the 2017 snap election. He received 27,093 votes, unseating the sitting MP, Rob Wilson of the Conservative Party, by a majority of 3,749.

In January 2018, Rodda was promoted to a frontbench position in a Shadow Cabinet mini-shuffle, becoming the Shadow Minister for Local Transport.

MP in the 2019 parliament 
In the general election held on 12 December 2019 Rodda was returned as the member of parliament for Reading East with an increased majority of 5,924. Rodda nominated Emily Thornberry in the 2020 Labour leadership election.

In the first Shadow Cabinet of Keir Starmer, Rodda was appointed Shadow Minister for Buses.

In January 2021, Rodda was appointed Shadow Minister for Pensions after Jack Dromey was promoted to be to the Shadow Cabinet Office after Helen Hayes resigned to abstain on the Brexit Bill. Rodda was replaced by Sam Tarry.

References

External links

Page on MyParliament website

1966 births
Living people
Labour Party (UK) MPs for English constituencies
UK MPs 2017–2019
Alumni of the University of Sussex
English journalists
English civil servants
Labour Party (UK) councillors
Councillors in Berkshire
Members of the Parliament of the United Kingdom for Reading
UK MPs 2019–present